Monument Creek is a tributary of Spring Brook in Luzerne County and Lackawanna County, in Pennsylvania, in the United States. The creek is considered to be a High-Quality Coldwater Fishery. It has one named tributary, which is known as Trout Creek. The surficial geology in the vicinity of Monument Creek consists of bedrock, Wisconsinan Till, alluvium, Wisconsinan Ice-Contact Stratified Drift, and fill.

Course
Monument Creek begins in a lake in Pittston Township, Luzerne County. It flows north-northeast for nearly a mile before passing through another pond and turning north. After a few tenths of a mile, it turns north-northeast again and exits Luzerne County. Upon exiting Luzerne County, the creek enters Spring Brook Township, Lackawanna County. It continues flowing north-northeast in a deep valley and re-enters Pittston Township, Luzerne County. It then turns northeast for a few tenths of a mile before turning north-northwest for several tenths of a mile, receiving the tributary Trout Creek from the right and crossing Pennsylvania Route 502 before reaching its confluence with Spring Brook.

Trbituaries
Monument Creek has one named tributary, which is known as Trout Creek.

Geography and geology

The surficial geology in the vicinity of the lower reaches of Monument Creek mainly consists of alluvium and Wisconsinan Ice-Contact Stratified Drift. However, a glacial or resedimented till known as Wisconsinan Till is also present, as is bedrock consisting of conglomerate, sandstone, and shale. Further upstream, the surficial geology consists almost entirely of Wisconsinan Till and bedrock, but some fill is present as well. Near the headwaters, there are also small patches of alluvium and Wisconsinan Ice-Contact Stratified Drift, as well as one lake.

Mount Pisgah is in the watershed of the creek.

Watershed
Monument Creek is entirely within the United States Geological Survey quadrangle of Avoca.

History
Monument Creek was entered into the Geographic Names Information System on August 2, 1979. Its identifier in the Geographic Names Information System is 1199184.

In the late 1800s, the water tank of the Wilkes-Barre and Eastern Railroad was located near Monument Creek.

The Pennsylvania American Water Company has a permit for encroachment to modify or maintain an aerial utility line that crosses Monument Creek in Pittston Township, Luzerne County. They also have a permit to repair  of the creek's streambank and install riprap.

Biology
Monument Creek is considered to be a High-Quality Coldwater Fishery.

See also
Covey Swamp Creek, next tributary of Spring Brook going downstream
Green Run (Spring Brook), next tributary of Spring Brook going upstream
List of rivers of Pennsylvania
List of tributaries of the Lackawanna River

References

External links
Google Street View image of Monument Creek
Another Google Street View image of Monument Creek

Rivers of Luzerne County, Pennsylvania
Rivers of Lackawanna County, Pennsylvania
Tributaries of Spring Brook (Lackawanna River)
Rivers of Pennsylvania